Pokkiri refers to two Indian films:

Pokiri, 2006 Telugu film
Pokkiri, 2007 Tamil film

See also
Pokkiri Raja (disambiguation)